Yoyaga Dit Coulibaly (born 20 January 1939) is an Ivorian sprinter. He competed in the 400 metres at the 1964 Summer Olympics at the 1968 Summer Olympics.

References

1939 births
Living people
Athletes (track and field) at the 1964 Summer Olympics
Athletes (track and field) at the 1968 Summer Olympics
Ivorian male sprinters
Olympic athletes of Ivory Coast
Place of birth missing (living people)